Amajuba is one of the 11 districts of KwaZulu-Natal province. The seat of Amajuba is Newcastle. The majority of its 468,040 people speak Zulu (2001 Census). The district code is DC25

Tourism
The Amajuba District is marketed as a battlefields tourism destination. Amajuba is an isiZulu name meaning “a place of doves”. The impis of King Shaka named the area Amajuba in 1825. The area is also the site of a battle in which the Boers defeated the British in 1881.

Geography

Neighbours
Amajuba is surrounded by:
 Gert Sibande in Mpumalanga to the north (DC30)
 Zululand to the east (DC26)
 Umzinyathi to the south (DC24)
 Uthukela to the south-west (DC23)
 Thabo Mofutsanyane in the Free State to the west (DC19)

Local municipalities
The district contains the following local municipalities:

Demographics
The following statistics are from the 2001 census.

Gender

Ethnic group

Age

Politics

Election results
Election results for Amajuba in the South African general election, 2004.
 Population 18 and over: 267 712 [57.20% of total population]
 Total votes: 118 344 [25.29% of total population]
 Voting % estimate: 44.21% votes as a % of population 18 and over

References 

 Municipal Demarcation Board
 Stats SA Census 2001 page
 Independent Electoral Commission 2004 election results

External links
 Amajuba District Municipality Website

District Municipalities of KwaZulu-Natal
Amajuba District Municipality